The Mississippi River Alluvial Plain is an alluvial plain created by the Mississippi River on which lie parts of seven U.S. states, from southern Louisiana to southern Illinois (Illinois, Missouri, Kentucky, Tennessee, Arkansas, Mississippi, Louisiana).

The plain is divided into (a) the Mississippi River Delta in the southern half of Louisiana and (b) the upper Mississippi Embayment running from central Louisiana to Illinois.

The term "Mississippi embayment" is sometimes used more narrowly to refer to its section on the western side of the river, running through eastern Arkansas, southeastern Missouri, westernmost Tennessee (east side of the River), westernmost Kentucky (east side of the River) and southernmost Illinois, and excluding northwest Mississippi where the alluvial plain is known as the Mississippi Delta.

It is the largest ecoregion of Louisiana, covering , and including all of the historic Mississippi River floodplain.

References

Mississippi River
Mississippi embayment
Floodplains of the United States
Plains of the United States
Physiographic sections